Dog Eat Dog may refer to:

Film and television
 Dog Eat Dog (1964 film), a 1964 Italian film
 Dog Eat Dog (2001 film), a 2001 UK film
 Dog Eat Dog (2008 film), a 2008 Colombian film by director Carlos Moreno
 Dog Eat Dog (2016 film), a 2016 American film by Paul Schrader
 Dog Eat Dog (2018 film), a 2018 Norwegian short film by Rikke Gregersen
 Dog Eat Dog Films, a production company operated by Michael Moore
 Dog Eat Dog (game show), a UK game show
 Dog Eat Dog (U.S. game show), the U.S. version of the UK show

Television show episodes
 "Dog Eat Dog" (The Bill)
 "Dog Eat Dog" (CSI), an episode of the American crime drama CSI: Crime Scene Investigation
 "Dog Eat Dog" (Cashmere Mafia)
 "Dog Eat Dog" (The Gates)
 "Dog Eat Dog" (Picket Fences)
 "Dog Eat Dog" (Underbelly: The Golden Mile)
 "Dog Eat Dog", an episode of Street Hawk

Music
 Dog Eat Dog (band), an American hardcore/rapcore group
 Dog Eat Dog (Joni Mitchell album), 1985 (and the title track on the album)
 Dog Eat Dog (Warrant album), 1992
 "Dog Eat Dog" (AC/DC song), 1977
 "Dog Eat Dog" (Adam and the Ants song), 1980
 "Dog Eat Dog", a 1996 song by De La Soul from Stakes Is High
 "Dog Eat Dog", a 2010 song by Hocico from Tiempos de Furia
 "Dog Eat Dog", a 1976 song by Ted Nugent from Free-for-All
 "Dog Eat Dog", a 1986 song by "Weird Al" Yankovic from Polka Party!
 "Dog Eats Dog", a song from the musical Les Misérables

Literature
 Dog Eat Dog (Mhlongo novel), a campus novel by Niq Mhlongo
 Dog Eat Dog, a novel by Edward Bunker
 Dog Eat Dog, a novel by David J. Rodger

Other uses
 Dog Eat Dog, an unreleased game by computer-game developer Trilobyte
 Care pe care (loosely translated: Dog eat dog), a Romanian television program hosted by Leonard Miron

See also
 Dog eat Doug, a comic strip